Altefeld (in its upper course: Schwarzer Fluß) is a river of Hesse, Germany. At its confluence with the Lauter in Bad Salzschlirf, the Schlitz is formed. It has a length of 30.0 km.

See also
List of rivers of Hesse

References

Rivers of Hesse
Rivers of the Vogelsberg
Rivers of Germany